Mateja Petronijević (born 1 September 1986 in Pula) is a Croatian sailor, who specialized in the Laser Radial class. In 2005, she won a silver medal for her class at the European Senior and Junior Cup in Izola, Slovenia, and bronze at the World Laser Sailing Cup in Hyères, France. She is also a member of J.K. Uljanik Plovidba Pula, and is coached and trained by Miomil Zuban.

Petronijevic represented Croatia at the 2008 Summer Olympics in Beijing, where she competed for the Laser Radial class. She finished eleventh overall in this event, with a net score of 98 points at the end of nine races.

References

External links
 
 
 
 
 

1986 births
Living people
Croatian female sailors (sport)
Olympic sailors of Croatia
Sailors at the 2008 Summer Olympics – Laser Radial
Sportspeople from Pula